In computational statistics, reversible-jump Markov chain Monte Carlo is an extension to standard Markov chain Monte Carlo (MCMC) methodology, introduced by Peter Green, which allows simulation of the posterior distribution on spaces of varying dimensions.
Thus, the simulation is possible even if the number of parameters in the model is not known. 

Let 

be a model indicator and  the parameter space whose number of dimensions  depends on the model . The model indication need not be finite. The stationary distribution is the joint posterior distribution of  that takes the values . 

The move to state  can thus be formulated as

The function

must be one to one and differentiable, and have a non-zero support:

so that there exists an inverse function 

that is differentiable.

This is known as dimension matching. 

If  then the dimensional matching
condition can be reduced to 

with

The acceptance probability will be given by

where  is the normalising constant.

Software packages  
There is an experimental RJ-MCMC tool available for the open source BUGs package.

The Gen probabilistic programming system automates the acceptance probability computation for user-defined reversible jump MCMC kernels as part of its Involution MCMC feature.

References

Computational statistics
Markov chain Monte Carlo